Anthony Joseph Kostos (June 12, 1905 – November 16, 1984) was an American football player. He was born in Mount Carmel, Pennsylvania, in 1905 and attended Mount Carmel High School. He played college football for Bucknell from 1923 to 1925. He later played professional football in the National Football League (NFL) for six years as an end, center, guard, and tackle for the Frankford Yellow Jackets (1927-1931) and Minneapolis Red Jackets (1930). He appeared in 66 NFL games, 47 as a starter. He also played for the Senandoah Presidents, and later worked as a football coach at Albright College. He died in 1984 in New Brunswick, New Jersey.

References

1905 births
1984 deaths
Bucknell Bison football players
Frankford Yellow Jackets players
Minneapolis Red Jackets players
Players of American football from Pennsylvania
American football tackles
People from Mount Carmel, Pennsylvania
American football guards
American football centers
American football ends